Monique Limón (born October 30, 1979) is an American politician serving as a member of the California State Senate. She is a Democrat representing the 19th Senate District, encompassing all of Santa Barbara County, as well as over half of Ventura County.

Early life and education 
Limón was born and raised in Santa Barbara, California. She earned a Bachelor of Arts degree from University of California, Berkeley and a Master of Arts from Columbia University.

Career 
She served six years on the Santa Barbara Unified School District Board of Education. Additionally, she served in the capacity of Assistant Director for the McNair Scholars Program at the University of California, Santa Barbara prior to serving in the Assembly.

She is a former Commissioner on the Santa Barbara County Commission for Women.

Limon ran as the 2020 Democratic nominee for the California State Senate's 19th district to succeed Hannah-Beth Jackson, who is ineligible to run due to term limits.

Elections

2020

2018

2016

References

External links 
 
 
 Campaign website
 Join California Monique Limón

Democratic Party members of the California State Assembly
Living people
21st-century American politicians
21st-century American women politicians
Hispanic and Latino American state legislators in California
Hispanic and Latino American women in politics
Women state legislators in California
People from Santa Barbara, California
1979 births
University of California, Berkeley alumni
Columbia University alumni